Happy Apple is an American jazz trio from Minneapolis, Minnesota.

Initially formed in 1996 by David King (drums), Michael Lewis (saxophone), Anton Denner (saxophone) and Cully Swansen (bass), since 1998 the lineup has consisted of King, Lewis, and bass guitarist Erik Fratzke.

All three members compose music for the group, which places equal emphasis on improvisation. Happy Apple plays a brand of jazz music drawing on several other genres; the group's members play in other bands ranging from indie rock and heavy metal to free jazz and electronic. The best known of these is The Bad Plus, in which King also plays drums.

The name Happy Apple comes from a Fisher-Price toy from the 1970s which King often uses as an auxiliary percussion instrument.

Discography

Studio albums
 Blown Shockwaves & Crash Flow (Self-Released, 1997)
 Part of the Solutionproblem (No Alternative, 1998)
 Body Popping Moon Walking Top Rocking (No Alternative, 1999)
 Please Refrain from Fronting (Self-Released, 2001)
 Youth Oriented (Sunnyside, 2003)
 The Peace Between Our Companies (Sunnyside, 2004 Europe, 2005 North America)
 Happy Apple Back on Top (Sunnyside, 2007)
 New York CD (Self-Released, 2020)

Live albums
 Jazzercise with the Elders/E Equals What I Says It Does/God Bless Certain Portions of the USA (Self-Released, 2000)

References

External links
Official site

American jazz ensembles from Minnesota
Musical groups from Minnesota